Nueve de Julio Partido (9 of July) is a partido in the central north of Buenos Aires Province in Argentina.

Name
The name 9 de Julio was inspired by July 9, 1816, Argentine Independence Day, the date that Argentina gained its independence from the Spanish Empire.

Settlements
 9 de Julio
 12 de Octubre
 Alfredo Demarchi (Estación Facundo Quiroga),
 Carlos María Naón
 Dennehy
 Dudignac
 French, La Niña
 Morea
 Patricios
 Villa Fournier (El Provincial),

External links

 
 Local Information (Spanish)
  Nueve de Julio Website (Spanish)
 Information about the city

1865 establishments in Argentina
Partidos of Buenos Aires Province